Sanjay Puran Singh Chauhan (born 8 September) is an Indian film director and screenwriter, who is most known for his internationally acclaimed film Lahore. He won the Indira Gandhi Award for Best Debut Film of a Director at the 2009 National Film Award. In 2021, he won the National Film Award for Best Direction for the film Bahattar Hoorain.

Filmography
Lahore (2010) (Director, Story, Screenplay & Dialogues)
Bahattar Hoorain (2019) (Director & Editor)
83 (2021) (writer)
Gorkha (2022) (Director, Story, Screenplay & Dialogues)

Awards

National Awards
Winner
2009 - National Film Award for Best Debut Film for the film Lahore
2021 - National Film Award for Best Direction for the film Bahattar Hoorain.

International Film Festival of India
Winner
2019 - ICFT-UNESCO GANDHI MEDAL “Special Mention” at 50th International Film Festival of India, Goa for Bahattar Hoorain

Indian Panorama 
2019 - Bahattar Hoorain selected at the Indian Panorama

International awards
Winner
2022 - Writer - Best Story (Adapted) at IIFA (International Indian Film Academy Awards), for 83
2009 - Best Film, Special Jury Award at 42nd Worldfest, Houston International Film Festival, US for Lahore

Nomination
2022 - Best Screenplay Writer at 67th Filmfare Awards, for 83
2009 - Best Director at Asian Festival of 1st Films, Singapore for Lahore
2009 - Best Writer at Asian Festival of 1st Films, Singapore for Lahore
2010 - Hottest New Director at Stardust Awards for Lahore

Jury Member
2016 - Jury Member at 63rd National Film Awards
Jury member feature film, Indian Panorama at 51st International Film Festival of India, Goa 2021.
 Jury member (selection) for '75 Creative minds of the tomorrow', at 52nd International Film Festival of India, Goa 2021.

References

External links
 
 
 
 Silent scenes are more symbolic: Sanjay Puran Singh Chauhan DNA

1975 births
Living people
Best Director National Film Award winners
Director whose film won the Best Debut Feature Film National Film Award
Film directors from Madhya Pradesh
Hindi-language film directors
Indian male screenwriters
21st-century Indian film directors
People from Gwalior